"Guardian of Piri" is the eighth episode of the first series of Space: 1999.  The screenplay was written by Christopher Penfold.

Story

Teaser 

The moon is in range of a planet but Computer has not offered any prediction as to whether it would support life. Kano informs Koenig that it has been scanning the planet continuously since they became aware the planet existed but still has insufficient data to make a prediction.

Koenig does not understand how Computer can remotely control a reconnaissance flight to the surface yet at the same time not determine whether that surface could sustain life. Kano replies that the Computer would not be so irrational as to guess.

Meanwhile the reconnaissance Eagle, piloted by Peter Irving and Ed Davis, is moving into a low orbit for final descent, two hours ahead of schedule. They are making good time - either that or Computer made a mistake.

Carter thinks the Eagle is too low and is descending too rapidly but Kano counters that they are doing just fine by Computer. Irving reports that they are on course and holding and that everything is fine, but Carter observes that they are too close and too fast.

Irving playfully flies the Eagle in circles above the surface and jokes with Carter that he must be jealous. As he continues to fly in circles and laughs, all transmissions from the Eagle suddenly cease and they disappear from scanners.

Act one 

During a staff meeting Carter is frustrated over the loss of the pilots and demands to know why Computer fouled up on normal flying data - time, distance, orbital velocity, rate of descent. Kano insists that Computer does not make mistakes; it cannot assess the planet unless it is fed the right information.

What bothers Commander Koenig is why Irving and Davis had no sense of danger. Carter insists it is because they believed what Computer told them, which is why Koenig wants Carter to return to the planet and fly on manual all the way and not to rely on Computer at all.

After Carter leaves, Bergman explains to the remaining staff that the curve of their course is tightening - they are closer than they expected. That could be either good or bad - if the planet can sustain them then they have more time to explore and make up their mind about settling there; however, if it's affecting them badly then the closer they get the worse it will be.

Suddenly Koenig notices that Bergman is not feeling well. Bergman says he'll be alright and then promptly collapses. Dr. Russell examines him - she finds him “unconscious, rapid heartbeat,” yet according to his monitor he is fine.

After Dr. Russell has examined Professor Bergman in Med Lab she discovers that the amounts of oxygen in their atmosphere has been slowly decreasing. Bergman's mechanical heart did not make a natural adjustment the way an organic heart would, hence his collapse. Koenig concludes that they can't even rely on Computer for normal internal services. He orders Sandra Benes to put Alpha atmosphere control on manual and to keep her eye glued to it.

Bergman has recovered consciousness and is in good spirits. Bergman reports no after effects from his ordeal, just a few “strange fantasies” - he has a powerful instinct that the planet is going to be just the right place for the Alphans. Koenig responds that it will take a lot more than fantasy to convince him of that.

Suddenly Dr. Matthias observes that Sara Graham, the patient in the next bed, is dead. He notes that the transfusion blood supply stopped.

At first Dr. Russell sharply rebukes him for allowing this to happen. Dr. Matthias snaps back that he cannot control everything - “I am not a computer!”

Meanwhile Alan Carter and his co-pilot are descending to the surface of the planet. Checking his instruments, Carter observes that Computer was wrong about the g-force. Carter has cut his approach speed back and reckons they are holding on nicely. Paul Morrow and Sandra Benes are monitoring from Mission Control. Benes observes that according to readings Carter is right over the crash site. As Carter pilots his Eagle into line of site range of Davis and Irving's Eagle he sees a strange sight. The Eagle is suspended in mid-air. “They haven't crashed!” he reports. Carter begins to dock with the suspended Eagle.

Having completed the docking manoeuvre Carter boards the ill-fated Eagle. Upon making his way through, he arrives at the Control Module to fit it unoccupied with no sign of its pilots. He makes a walking inspection through the rest of the craft and reports to Paul Morrow - “It's a Mary Celeste. There's no one here.”

Back on Alpha, Koenig orders Carter to return to Moonbase and in an agitated tone tells Kano he wants to talk to him.

Kano follows Koenig into his office. Koenig asks for a straight and simple report - “What is going on?”

Kano replies that he has found no fault in the system.

Koenig tells Kano that Sara Graham died while hooked up to a computerized monitor following what should have been a simple blood transfusion. Professor Bergman's collapse was due to lack of oxygen, because Computer went haywire. It's fouling everything from commlock systems to important data and Alpha is in desperate trouble. They need to find out what is going on down on the planet and obviously Computer is not functioning properly.

Kano repeats that they can find no fault. Koenig concludes that maybe they are looking for the wrong things in the wrong way. Koenig knows one way to find out, and asks if Kano is willing to go through with it. Kano is shaken but reluctantly agrees.

Some time later, Kano is prepped in Med Lab for a procedure. Koenig explains that he asked David Kano to go through with it because of what is happening on Alpha. Dr. Russell fills in the medical staff on the background. Dr. Russell explains that Kano was one of the few people to take part in an experimental program on Earth. He underwent an operation to implant a complex of fibre sensors in the cortex of his brain. The intention was to link the enormous memory and calculating ability of the computer with the unique thinking ability of the human brain. Koenig hopes that by getting inside the computer Kano will determine exactly how it is being affected by the planet. Drs. Russell and Matthias begin the procedure. After a moment of severe discomfort Kano relaxes and smiles. Then with a flash of light he disappears, startling Dr. Russell.

Act two 

In Main Mission Professor Bergman elatedly confirms that the moon is in orbit. Koenig remarks that while they're in orbit they are trapped. Bergman is surprisingly optimistic, despite that Alpha has so far lost three men and have no idea what happened to them. With no rational explanation, Dr. Russell fears that whatever happened to the three lost men could happen to any one of them. Bergman checks another reading from the Computer and confirms that the planet will support life. Koenig prompts him for details which Bergman claims will follow. Koenig does not want to rely on Computer - it seems to be telling them just what they want to hear. Carter and Bergman conclude that there must be some kind of power there that is not necessarily malevolent. Koenig responds that when they do leave Alpha for the last time it will be their decision rather than being presented with an accomplished fact. Koenig decides to take Carter with him down to the planet.

After their Eagle touches down Koenig instructs Carter that under no circumstances is he to leave the ship. Koenig steps out to investigate while Carter remains aboard the Eagle.

Koenig scans the white spheres that are all around and contacts Mission Control on Alpha. He reports that he gets no readings at all - whatever the spheres are or were they're dead now. Koenig says that he will take a walk around and call back if he finds anything unusual.

While walking around Koenig spots the suspended Eagle, then notices pilots Peter Irving and Ed Davis. Each man is still, unresponsive when Koenig calls them, in a trance. Kano is there as well, still, frozen, unresponsive. Koenig slaps Kano several times to get his attention. Kano does not respond to the physical slap, but monotonically states “Computer is right. Piri is just perfect for all our needs.” Koenig tells him there is nothing there - there is no life.

A light then manifests and out of it a female figure emerges and approaches Koenig. He discreetly pulls out his stun gun and she speaks to him, telling him that she is sent to calm his fears and bring him peace. She explains that she has come like this in human form so that he might understand her presence. He asks who sent her. She replies that she is the servant of the Guardian. They found the Earth's moon floating helplessly throughout their universe. They have brought the Alphans to Piri to relieve the humans of their pain. Koenig asks if they are inviting the Alphans to stay and settle here. The female tells him that is the will of the Guardian. She offers to show him the peace of Piri.

As they walk she explains that millennia ago this planet was peopled by Pirians and great technical skill. They built a world of machines to run the necessities of life so that the people could enjoy their pleasure. Then they created the Guardian to control the machines and save them from decisions. Their life was perfect and the Guardian was directed to maintain it. Koenig replies that this is not possible for human beings, which are born, live, and die. Life is transient and cannot be maintained. The woman notes that humans are imperfect and take time for granted. Absolute perfection lasts forever and so the Guardian has suspended time. Koenig determines that this planet is not suitable for human life.

Koenig asks about his men and how the Guardian got them here. She tells him that “We reached out and offered them happiness, and they accepted.” Time is stopping for them. Koenig does not like this. He believes that life is stopping for them. They argue and Koenig sticks to his position that this place is not for humans. She tells him that they have already accepted the dominion of the Guardian - there is nothing that Koenig can do. He turns away and tries to convince Kano to go with him.

Kano does not respond. He tries with Pete, who also does not respond. The servant of the Guardian tells Koenig that the Guardian is making him perfect, as that is its prime directive. The servant vanishes into the light while Koenig runs towards the Eagle and calls to Carter to prepare for liftoff. Carter does not respond; he is relaxing aboard the Eagle and ignoring Koenig's call.

Koenig arrives at the Eagle and they lift off from the surface. Carter comments that this is a nice place, kind of peaceful and Koenig replies that this is no place for the Alphans. Carter gives Koenig a strange look and to Koenig's alarm begins flying the Eagle erratically. Koenig wrestles Carter away from the controls. The two men fight in the cabin while the Eagle, unpiloted, flies in circles above the planet's surface. Koenig finally overpowers Carter and takes over control of the Eagle. With one arm injured in the fight, Koenig uses his other arm to stabilize the Eagle and return to Moonbase Alpha. He attempts to contact Alpha en route but his signal is ignored. His voice echoes through Main Mission which is deserted. He requests directions for final approach and for Dr. Russell to have a medical team stand by. There is no response.

Meanwhile Paul Morrow and various staff are singing and cavorting, oblivious to Koenig's call. Koenig lands the Eagle. He stumbles through the corridors of Moonbase Alpha, hearing the sounds of the crowd cheering and celebrating in the distance. Exhausted and in pain, he makes his way to the crowd just as Professor Bergman jubilantly proposes a toast to the new world. Russell and Bergman notice Koenig walk into the room and toast him - “to our very own Christopher Columbus!” Koenig collapses while the crowd sings “For he's a jolly good fellow.”

Act three 

Koenig regains consciousness. He is on a bed in Med Lab. Dr. Matthias notices that Koenig is awake and tells him to relax. Koenig asks where is Dr. Russell and Dr. Matthias tells him she is attending a command conference. Koenig walks out of Med Lab and makes his way to Main Mission. He walks in on the command conference in the midst of a discussion about whether to bring an operating theatre down to the planet. Professor Bergman points out that with the moon in a fixed orbit around Piri they can return whenever they'd like - so when someone needs an operation they would bring them back to Alpha to perform the operation and return. The command staff notice Koenig's presence - he has arrived just as they are planning the last phase of Operation Exodus. They are making their plans on the basis of phoney reports - Piri has attacked their computer and their minds. He does not succeed in convincing them of what he really saw on the planet. Koenig runs out of the conference room while the command staff resume planning their exodus.

Koenig attempts to disable the Auxiliary systems and is informed that his orders conflict with the directives of the Guardian. Frustrated, he begins pulling circuits out of the computer bank. Paul Morrow runs in and tries to stop him. Koenig knocks him out and continues pulling out circuits. Then Professor Bergman confronts him. Koenig insists that he is not mad - he is the only sane one left. He tries to convince the crew that they are in danger from the Guardian. Dr. Russell approaches him and discreetly injects him with a sedative, and Koenig again collapses.

After some time has passed he awakes in his quarters. He gets up to leave and is informed by the computer that his commlock device is disabled and that he is confined to his quarters. Koenig asks by whose order and is told by Operation Exodus committee. Koenig demands to know which individual and is told it was Dr. Russell, on the grounds that his freedom diminishes the safety of Alpha.

Meanwhile in the conference room Dr. Russell approaches Professor Bergman and reports that Koenig is conscious again - and that Computer says he is as picky as ever. Dr. Russell suggests that they don't take Koenig, but Bergman believes that Koenig will come around and change his mind. They decide to leave Koenig an Eagle so that when he comes to his senses he would join them in his own good time.

Koenig paces in his quarters when the base goes dark. With the power out he realizes he is no longer locked in his quarters. Koenig goes out and walks through the abandoned corridors. He makes his way to the abandoned Main Mission, just in time to see the fleet of Eagles taking off from Alpha. He watches the Eagles fly towards Piri, leaving him alone and abandoned on Alpha.

Act four 

Koenig walks through the abandoned Main Mission and addresses Computer. “I have to talk to someone.” The machine responds that only auxiliary services are available; Computer has removed to planet Piri. Alone and dejected, Koenig contemplates his pills. Suddenly the female servant of the Guardian appears and chastises him. “I took you for a stronger man. Just how long do you think you can last?” Three days of despair have reduced him to pills to help him sleep the hours away. In his crude human way he tries to numb his mind against the Guardian. “And yet the Guardian can make the process much easier for you.” She gestures toward the view screen which displays the Alphans on the surface below. “If only you would choose the Pirian way.” She acknowledges that Koenig fought hard in the struggle for survival and that his burden of responsibility has been almost unbearable - and yet he has borne it. She heals the wound on his forehead and his broken arm, and tells him that he can now relax and enjoy the peace which he has earned for his people. His wounds are healed and Dr. Russell has not had to lift a finger. For Dr. Russell her nerves are relaxed and her appetites are assuaged. Her struggle is over and Koenig may join her in paradise. Angered, Koenig punches a display monitor and again injures his hand. The servant approaches him to heal it again. He refuses to allow her, and tells her to leave him with his pain. It reminds him he is human.

The servant explains that the arrival of the Alphans has disturbed the peace of Piri and that they must be made fit to live there. That is the Guardian's directive.

Koenig asks if that is why the Guardian has sabotaged their computer. The servant explains that the computer was not sabotaged, merely taken over for the Guardian's use. Of all things on Alpha its mind was most nearly perfect and it most readily accepted the will of the Guardian. Koenig argues that it may be alright for the computer because it's a machine, but the Alphans are human beings - they can't exist on Pirian terms. The servant responds that perfection is absolute; the Alphans must be made perfect. Koenig walks away and makes his way to the remaining Eagle. He pilots it back to Piri.

On the surface, the Alphans stand or recline in a dazed state without a care. Dr. Russell and Professor Bergman observe the arrival of Koenig's Eagle. “There's John.” Helena Russell considers whether she should go to him, and decides that he will find his way.

Koenig has landed and finds Sandra Benes. He asks her where the Pirians are. She barely registers his presence and responds with gibberish. Koenig finds Paul Morrow, who also does not help. “We're all so happy!” he says.

Koenig finds Helena Russell. She thinks he has come to join them at last. Koenig asks her where the Pirians are. “They have given us eternal life,” is her only reply. Koenig takes her by the arm and guides her back to the Eagle as she giggles. Once aboard he sits her down and connects her to a medical machine. He uses the machine to shock her system. After several attempts he dials the intensity high enough to finally break her out of her trance. She asks if her heart stopped. “Worse. Much worse,” he tells her. He is glad to have her back. He asks her to tell him exactly what happened. She recalls the exodus. They went down to the planet and there was just a light. Koenig recognizes that the light is the Guardian; he wants to know about the people who control it. Russell tells him that she did not see any people. Koenig asks her to think hard. Were there any machines? Russell tells him there was nothing there. Nothing moves, and no sign of life. Koenig realizes that there is in fact no life, no Pirians.

The servant of the Guardian is aware of what Koenig has done and calls on the other Alphans. She tells them that there is one amongst them who threatens their happiness, who comes to destroy their peace. This one will not accept the dominion of the Guardian and he must be destroyed. She tells him it is their commander, John Koenig, and that they must destroy him so that the Guardian may live and protect them forever. The Alphans chant “Long live the Guardian!”

The Alphans spot Koenig walking with Russell towards the portal of light. Carter stalks him with his stun gun drawn. After a few shots are exchanged Koenig stuns Carter. He runs towards the portal - the Guardian. The Alphans tell him there is no place for him - that he is destroying their peace, and they're going to kill him now. Russell has picked up Carter's stun gun and defends Koenig.

Koenig aims his stun gun at the servant and demands where are her own people. He points out that they don't exist because they died, just like his own people are dying right now. He fires at the servant and she falls back. Koenig approaches her and when he uncovers her face he sees that she is a machine. He lifts up her form to show the Alphans. “This is what passes for life on Piri!” he tells them.

Suddenly the Guardian explodes. The Alphans snap out of their trance and Bergman points out “The moon is going out of orbit!” Koenig orders everyone back to their ships. As the planet deteriorates the Alphans scatter and run back to their Eagles. They lift off their Eagles and return to Alpha, their home.

Back on the moonbase, the Alphans reflect on what they have just experienced. Dr. Russell observes that when Koenig destroyed the servant he destroyed the Guardian. With no Guardian to suspend time, time was restored and the moon resumed its original course, past the planet. Kano reports that Computer has analyzed the data from the long range sensors. Planet Piri now has life, water, vegetation, everything. Koenig muses that they brought a dead planet back to life. He wonders if they should have stayed.

Cast

Starring 

 Martin Landau — Commander John Koenig
 Barbara Bain — Doctor Helena Russell

Also starring 

 Barry Morse — Professor Victor Bergman

Guest artist 

 Catherine Schell - Servant of the Guardian

Featuring 

 Prentis Hancock — Controller Paul Morrow
 Zienia Merton — Sandra Benes
 Anton Phillips — Doctor Bob Mathias
 Nick Tate — Captain Alan Carter

References

External links 
 Space: 1999 - "Guardian of Piri" - The Catacombs episode guide
 Space: 1999 - "Guardian of Piri" - Moonbase Alpha's Space: 1999 page
 

1975 British television episodes
Space: 1999 episodes